Miss Korea is a national beauty pageant in South Korea.

Lee Seung-hyeon won the title on October 26, 2022.

History
The first Miss Korea competition took place in 1957 and was sponsored by the Korean newspaper Hankook Ilbo. Each year, approximately fifty women compete in Seoul, South Korea, and seven are selected by a panel of judges. The winner "Jin" (진) is crowned as the official Miss Korea. Additionally, there are two "Sun" (선) finalists (equivalent to 1st runners-up), who go on to compete in Miss International or Miss Earth. Lastly, four "Mi" (미) finalists (equivalent to semi-finalists) are chosen.

On March 16, 2011, the president of the Miss World Organization, Julia Morley, announced the newly launched Miss World Korea pageant. Until 2010, Miss Korea would also select the representative to Miss World, but starting with Miss World 2011, a separate competition has been held to choose the contestant who will represent Korea.

In 2015, Hanju E&M took over Miss Korea Organization. Since 2016, Miss Korea organization no longer send South Korea's representative to Miss Universe.

In 2022, Mina Sue Choi represented Korea at the 22nd Miss Earth pageant, which was held in Parañaque, Philippines on November 29, 2022, and eventually won the crown, making Korea's first ever victory on any of the big four international beauty pageants.

Titleholders

Color key

Miss International Korea
Korea debuted at Miss International in 1960. One of the two 1st runner-ups (Sun) of Miss Korea represents her country at Miss International. On occasion, when the candidate doesn't qualify for any reason for the contest, another girl is sent. Traditionally, 1st runner-up competed at Miss World but since 2011, the 1st runner-up of Miss Korea represents her country at Miss International.

Miss Earth Korea
Korea debuted at Miss Earth in 2002. One of the two 1st runner-ups (Sun) of Miss Korea represents her country at Miss Earth. On occasion, when the candidate doesn't qualify for any reason for the contest, another girl is sent

Former titles

Miss Universe Korea
Korea debuted at Miss Universe in 1954, three years before the first Miss Korea pageant. Since 2016, Korean representatives at Miss Universe have been chosen in a separate pageant, Miss Universe Korea, and the Miss Korea Organization no longer sends South Korea's representative to Miss Universe.

Miss World Korea
Korea debuted at Miss World in 1959. The 1st Runner-up of Miss Korea represented the nation at Miss World. Since 2011, Korean representatives at the Miss World are chosen in a separate pageant Miss World Korea, that separate contest is to only focus on Miss World.

See also

 Miss Queen Korea
 Miss Grand Korea
 Mister World Korea
 Mister International Korea
Mrs Korea
 South Korea at major beauty pageants

References

External links

 Miss Korea official website

Miss Korea
1957 establishments in South Korea
Recurring events established in 1957
South Korean popular culture
Beauty pageants in South Korea
South Korea
South Korea
South Korea
South Korean awards
Annual events in South Korea
Lists of women